Sopel may refer to:
Brent Sopel (born 1977), Canadian professional hockey player
Jon Sopel (journalist) (born 1959), English television presenter and correspondent
Sopel, Łódź Voivodeship, a village in Poland
LSPZRA Sopel, a prototype Polish self-propelled anti-aircraft gun (SPAAG)

See also